Mix Up may refer to:

Mix Up (radio show), an Australian dance music program
Mix-Up, a 1979 album by Cabaret Voltaire
The Mix-Up, a 2007 album by the Beastie Boys
Mix Up, a 1984 album by Annie Whitehead
Mix-Up, a 1990 album by Patrick O'Hearn
"Mix Up", a song by The Gladiators from Trenchtown Mix Up, 1976
"Mix Up", a song by Bunny Wailer from Hall of Fame: A Tribute to Bob Marley's 50th Anniversary, 1995

See also
Mixed Up (disambiguation)
Mix It Up (disambiguation)